The Liguilla of the Primera División de México Apertura 2009 was a final mini-tournament involving eight teams of the Mexican Primera División, in an elimination two-legs playoff.

The final of the Liguilla was on Sunday December 13, between Cruz Azulagainst Monterrey. As the winner, Monterrey became the Apertura 2009 Champion. Also, both finalist got a berth for the 2010–11 CONCACAF Champions League (Monterreyqualified directly to the group stage, while Cruz Azulqualified to the preliminary round).

Defending champions UNAM, were not able to defend their past championship, as they did not qualify to the Liguilla.

Teams

As the 18 teams of the Apertura 2009 were divided in three groups of six teams, it was determined that the two top of each group advanced to the Liguilla, even though having had a low performance at the general table. Alongside those six teams, the two best teams at the general table of the remaining 12, regardless of their group, advanced to the Liguilla.

After having finished last at their group and 17th at the general table, the defending champions, UNAM, did not qualify to this Liguilla

1.Best ranked out of the two top of each group.
2.Although having been 11th, as having been runner-up of Group 1, San Luisadvanced.

Tie-breaking criteria
The Liguilla has a particular tie-breaking criteria: In case of a tie in the aggregate score, the higher seeded team will advance.

The exception for this tie-breaking criteria is the final, where the higher seeded team rule is not used. In this case, if the teams remained tied after 90 minutes of play during the second leg of the finals, extra time will be used, followed by a penalty shootout if necessary.

Bracket
The Liguilla hade those teams play two games against each other on a home-and-away basis. The winner of each match up was determined by aggregate score.

The teams were seeded one to eight in quarterfinals, and re-seeded one to four in semifinals, depending on their position at the general table of the season. Higher seeded teams play on their home field during the second leg.

Also, the highest seeded can choose when, if Saturday or Sunday, they want to play the second leg. As the rules mention that one half of the matches must be on Wednesday/Saturday, and the other in Thursday/Sunday, the rest of the teams must suit on that choice. The only exception is the final, as it was set to be played at Thursday December 10 the first leg, and Sunday December 13 the second.

1.Advanced by best position on the general table.

Quarter-finals
The quarterfinals are scheduled to be played on November 21 or 22 (first leg) and November 28 or 29 (second leg).

1.Advanced by best position on the general table.

Kickoffs are given in local time (UTC-6).

First leg

Before the kickoff, a posthumous homage to Antonio de Nigris, who died on November 16, 2009, took place. He began his youth and senior career in Monterrey.

Second leg

Semi-finals
The semifinals are scheduled to be played on December 2 or 3 (first leg) and December 5 or 6 (second leg).

Kickoffs are given in local time (UTC-6).

First leg

Second leg

Final

The first and second legs of the final are scheduled to be played on December 10 (first leg) and December 13 (second leg).

Kickoffs are given in local time (UTC-6).

First leg

Second leg

Goalscorers
4 goals

 Aldo de Nigris (Monterrey)
 Humberto Suazo (Monterrey)

3 goals
 Nicolás Olivera (Puebla)

2 goals

 Jaime Lozano (Cruz Azul)
 Carlos Ochoa (Santos Laguna)
 Cristian Riveros (Cruz Azul)
 Miguel Sabah (Morelia)
 Emanuel Villa (Cruz Azul)

1 goal

 Alejandro Acosta (Puebla)
 Pablo Aguilar (San Luis)
 Jared Borgetti (Puebla)
 Isaác Brizuela (Toluca)
 Melvin Brown (Cruz Azul)
 Salvador Cabañas (América)
 Abraham Carreño (Monterrey)
 Alejandro Castro (Cruz Azul)
 Hugo Droguett (Morelia)
 Julio Domínguez (Cruz Azul)
 Héctor Mancilla (Toluca)
 Fausto Pinto (Cruz Azul)
 Javier Orozco (Cruz Azul)
 Mauricio Romero (Morelia)
 Sergio Santana (Monterrey)
 Wilson Tiago (Morelia)
 Gerardo Torrado (Cruz Azul)
 Nicolás Vigneri (Puebla)
 César Villaluz (Cruz Azul)

Own goal
 Emanuel Villa (Cruz Azul; for Monterrey)

References

2009–10 Primera División de México season